The  was a class of four battlecruisers built for the Imperial Japanese Navy (IJN) immediately before World War I. Designed by British naval architect George Thurston, the lead ship of the class, was the last Japanese capital ship constructed outside Japan, by Vickers at Barrow-in-Furness.

During the late 1920s, all but Hiei were reconstructed and reclassified as battleships. After the signing of the London Naval Treaty in 1930, Hiei was reconfigured as a training ship to avoid being scrapped. Following Japan's withdrawal from the treaty, all four underwent a massive second reconstruction in the late 1930s.

The Kongō-class battleships were the most active capital ships of the Japanese Navy during World War II, participating in most major engagements of the war. Hiei and Kirishima acted as escorts during the attack on Pearl Harbor, while Kongō and Haruna supported the invasion of Singapore. All four participated in the battles of Midway and Guadalcanal. Hiei and Kirishima were both lost during the Naval Battle of Guadalcanal in November 1942, while Haruna and Kongō jointly bombarded the American Henderson Field airbase on Guadalcanal. The two remaining Kongō-class battleships spent most of 1943 shuttling between Japanese naval bases before participating in the major naval campaigns of 1944. Haruna and Kongō engaged American surface vessels during the Battle of Leyte Gulf in late October 1944. Kongō was torpedoed and sunk by the submarine  in November 1944, while Haruna was sunk at her moorings by an air attack in Kure Naval Base in late July 1945, but later raised and scrapped in 1946.

Design

The design of the Kongō-class battlecruisers came about as a result of the IJN's modernization programs, as well as the perceived need to compete with the British Royal Navy.

In April 1907, the Royal Navy launched  at Newcastle upon Tyne. Armed with eight  main guns, Invincible rendered all current—and designed—Japanese capital ships obsolete by comparison. In 1911, the Japanese Diet passed the Emergency Naval Expansion Bill, authorizing the construction of one battleship and four armoured cruisers, to be designed by British naval architect George Thurston.

Under the terms of the contract signed with Vickers in November 1910, one member of the Kongō class—the lead ship Kongō—was to be built in Britain and Vickers was to maximize the transfer of naval technology to Japan. The design of the ships was from Vickers Design 472C (corresponding to the Japanese design designation B-46). The original design, which is commonly known as "Ishizuchi" featured ten 12-inch (304.8 mm) 50-calibre guns, sixteen  guns, and eight  torpedo tubes. 
Commander Katô Hirohasu pushed for the adoption of a new /45 calibre gun that was currently under development. After trials of the new gun, which were witnessed by both the Japanese Navy and Royal Navy, the Japanese made the decision on 29 Nov 1911 to use the new gun despite the keel having already been laid down on 17 January 1911, and the resulting need to quickly make a large number of alterations to the design, so as to not prolong the construction. Due to the size of the guns, only 8 were installed, and a plane installed in place of an extra turret.

To ensure transfer of the latest design knowledge to Japan more than 100 technical specialists were sent on 18 months secondments from Japan to Vickers during the construction phase of Kongō. If superintendents, supervisors and trial witnesses are also included then about 200 Japanese spent time in Britain.

Description

Propulsion
The Kongō-class ships had two sets of Parsons direct-drive steam turbines, except for Harunas Brown-Curtis turbines, each of which drove two propeller shafts. The high-pressure turbines drove the wing shafts while the low-pressure turbines drove the inner shafts. The turbines were arranged in two compartments, separated by a centerline longitudinal bulkhead; both compartments were situated between turrets No. 3 and 4. The boilers, arranged in eight compartments, were mixed-firing with fuel oil sprayed onto the coal for extra power.

During their 1930s reconstructions into fast battleships, the existing boilers were removed and replaced with eleven oil-fired Kampon boilers. These upgraded boilers gave the Kongō and her sister ships much greater power, with the ships of the class capable of speeds exceeding . This made them the only Japanese battleships at the time fully suited to operations alongside fast aircraft carriers.

Armament

The primary armament of the Kongō class consisted of eight  14"/45 guns, mounted in four superfiring twin-gun turrets. The turrets had an elevation capability of −5/+20 degrees, except in Kongō, whose turrets had a maximum elevation capability of +25 degrees. The shells could be loaded at any angle and the guns had a firing cycle of 30–40 seconds. These guns and their turrets underwent multiple modernizations throughout the ships' careers. During the first reconstruction of the class during the 1920s, the elevation of the main guns was increased to a maximum of +33 degrees. The recoil mechanism of the guns was also changed from a hydraulic to pneumatic system, which allowed for a faster firing cycle of the main guns.

By World War II, the guns used Type 91 armor-piercing, capped shells. A special Type 3 Sanshikidan incendiary shrapnel shell was developed in the 1930s for anti-aircraft use.

As built, the Kongō class was fitted with a secondary armament of sixteen 15 cm/50 guns mounted in single casemates along the sides of the hull at the level of the upper deck. Eight guns were mounted per side, and each had an arc of fire of 130 degrees and a maximum elevation of +15 degrees.

The ships also mounted four 76 mm/40 anti-aircraft (AA) guns. Both ships were equipped with eight submerged  torpedo tubes, four on each broadside.

The Kongō class's secondary armament changed significantly over time. During the modernizations of the 1930s, all of the 76 mm guns were replaced with eight /40 dual-purpose guns. These guns were fitted on both sides of the fore and aft superstructures in four twin-gun mounts. Their maximum rate of fire was 14 rounds a minute, but their sustained rate of fire was around eight rounds per minute. During reconstruction, the two foremost 152 mm guns were also removed.

The light AA armament of the Kongō class changed dramatically from 1933 to 1944. During the second reconstruction, the ships were fitted with four to eight twin  machine-guns, later replaced by  gun mounts. Both weapons were license-built French Hotchkiss designs. The 25 mm guns were mounted on the Kongō class in single, double, and triple mounts. This model was the standard Japanese light anti-aircraft gun during World War II, but severe design shortcomings rendered it largely ineffective. The twin and triple mounts "lacked sufficient speed in train or elevation; the gun sights were unable to handle fast targets; the gun exhibited excessive vibration; the magazine was too small, and, finally, the gun produced excessive muzzle blast". Haruna ultimately carried 118 guns in 30 triple, two twin, and 24 single mounts.

Armour
The Kongō-class battlecruisers were designed with the intention of maximizing speed and maneuverability, and as such were not as heavily armoured as later Japanese capital ships. Nevertheless, the Kongō class possessed significant quantities of armour, and were heavily upgraded during their modernizations. Vickers Cemented was used in the construction of the Kongō, while the original armour of the other three was constructed of a variation of Krupp Cemented Armour, designed by the German Krupp Arms Works. Subsequent developments of Japanese armour technology relied upon a hybrid design of the two variations until drastic changes were made during the design of the Yamato class battleship in 1938. The armoured belt near the bow and stern of the vessels was strengthened with an additional  of cemented armour.

During the reconstructions that each ship underwent during the interwar period, most of the armour of the Kongō class was heavily upgraded. The main lower belt was strengthened to be a uniform thickness of 8 inches, while diagonal bulkheads of a depth ranging from  reinforced the main armoured belt. The upper belt remained unchanged, but was closed by 9-inch bulkheads at the bow and stern of the ships. The armour upgrades increased the displacement by close to 4,000 tons on each ship, violating the terms of the Washington Treaty. Even after these modifications, the armour capacity of the Kongō class remained much less than that of newer capital ships, a factor which played a major role in the sinking of Hiei and Kirishima at the hands of U.S. Navy cruisers and battleships in 1942.

Ships

Due to a lack of available slipways, the latter two were the first Japanese warships to be built by Japanese private shipyards. Completed by 1915, they were considered the first modern battlecruisers of the Imperial Japanese Navy. According to naval historian Robert Jackson, they "outclassed all other contemporary [capital] ships". The design was so successful that the construction of the fourth battlecruiser of the British Lion-class——was halted so that design features of the Kongō class could be added.

Kongō

Kongō was laid down 17 January 1911 at Barrow-in-Furness, England, launched 18 May 1912, and commissioned 16 August 1913. She arrived in Yokosuka via Singapore in November 1913 to undergo armaments sighting checks in Kure Naval Arsenal, being placed in reserve upon her arrival. On 23 August 1914, Japan formally declared war on the German Empire as part of her contribution to the Anglo-Japanese Alliance, and Kongō was deployed near Midway Island to patrol the communications lines of the Pacific Ocean, attached to the Third Battleship Division of the First Fleet. On 1 November 1924, Kongō docked at Yokosuka for modifications which improved fire control and main-gun elevation, and increased her antiaircraft armament. In September 1929, she began her first major reconstruction. Her horizontal armour, boilers, and machinery space were all improved, and she was equipped to carry Type 90 Model 0 floatplanes. When her reconstruction was completed on 31 March 1931, she was reclassified as a battleship.

On 1 June 1935, Kongōs second reconstruction began. Japan's withdrawal from the London Naval Treaty led to reconstruction of her forward tower to fit the pagoda mast style of design, improvements to the boilers and turbines, and reconfiguration of the aircraft catapults aft of Turret 3. Her new top speed of  qualified her as a  fast battleship. The modifications were completed on 8 January 1937. In either August or November 1941, she was assigned to the Third Battleship Division with her three sister ships, and sailed on 29 November as part of the main body—four fast battleships, three heavy cruisers, eight destroyers—for the Japanese invasion of Malaya and Singapore. Following the destruction of the British Force Z, the Main Body departed for French Indochina, before escorting a fast carrier task force in February during the invasion of the Dutch East Indies. Kongō provided cover for Japanese carriers during attacks on the Dutch East Indies in February and Ceylon in March and April. Kongō and Hiei were part of the Second Fleet Main Body during the Battle of Midway, but were diverted north on 9 June to assist in the invasion of the Aleutian Islands. Kongō and her sisters engaged American naval forces in the Battle of Guadalcanal. During this engagement Kongō and Haruna bombarded Henderson Field with 430 14-inch and 33 6-inch shells on 13 October 1942. Following armament and armour upgrades in late 1943 and early 1944, Kongō sailed as part of Admiral Jisaburō Ozawa's Mobile Fleet during the Battle of the Philippine Sea. During the Battle of Leyte Gulf, Kongō sortied as part of Admiral Kurita's Center Force, scoring hits on an American escort carrier and sinking or damaging two destroyers during the Battle off Samar. Kongō and an escort, were sunk northwest of Taiwan on 21 November 1944 by the submarine , after being hit on the port bow by two or three torpedoes. Approximately 1,200 of her crew—including her Captain and the commander of the Third Battleship Division, Vice Admiral Yoshio Suzuki—were lost. She was removed from the Navy List on 20 January 1945.

Hiei

Hiei was laid down at Yokosuka Naval Arsenal on 4 November 1911, launched 21 November 1912, and commissioned at Sasebo 4 August 1914, attached to the Third Battleship Division of the First Fleet. After conducting patrols off China and in the East China Sea during World War I, Hiei was placed in reserve in 1920. After undergoing minor reconstructions in 1924 and 1927, Hiei was demilitarized in 1929 to avoid being scrapped under the terms of the Washington Treaty; she was converted to a training ship in Kure from 1929 to 1932. All of her armour and most of her armament were removed under the restrictions of the treaty and carefully preserved. In 1933, she was refitted as an Imperial Service Ship and—following further reconstruction in 1934—became the Emperor's ship in late 1935. In 1937, following Japan's withdrawal from the London Treaty, Hiei underwent a massive reconstruction along lines similar to those of her sister ships. When the reconstruction was completed on 31 January 1940, Hiei was reclassified as a battleship. Hiei sailed in November 1941 as an escort of Vice-Admiral Chuichi Nagumo's carrier force which attacked Pearl Harbor. Hiei provided escort cover during carrier raids on Darwin in February 1942, before a joint engagement with Kirishima that sank an American destroyer in March. She participated in carrier actions against Ceylon and Midway Island, and was subsequently drydocked in July. Following carrier escort duty during the Battles of the Eastern Solomons and Santa-Cruz, Hiei departed as the flagship of Rear Admiral Hiroaki Abe's Combat Division 11 to bombard Henderson Field on the night of 12–13 November 1942. When the fleet encountered Rear Admiral Daniel Callaghan's Task Group in Ironbottom Sound, the First Naval Battle of Guadalcanal ensued. In an extremely confusing melee, Hiei disabled two American heavy cruisers—killing two rear admirals in the process—but was hit by about 85 shells from the guns of cruisers and destroyers, rendering her virtually unmaneuverable. Abe transferred his flag to Kirishima, and the battleship was taken under tow by the same ship, but one of her rudders froze in the full starboard position. Over the next day, Hiei was attacked by American aircraft many different times. While trying to evade an attack at 14:00, Hiei lost her emergency rudder and began to show a list to stern and starboard. Hiei was scuttled northwest of Savo Island on the evening of 13 November by Japanese destroyers.

Kirishima

Kirishimas keel was laid in Mitsubishi's Nagasaki yard on 17 March 1912. She was launched about a year and a half later (1 December 1913) and transferred to Sasebo Naval Arsenal for fitting out. After her completion on 19 April 1915, she served off Japan, China and Korea's coasts during the First World War. After the war, she alternated between being based in Japan and patrolling off Japanese ports. On 14 September 1922, she collided with the destroyer , causing minor damage to both ships. Kirishima also assisted rescue efforts in the aftermath of the devastating 1923 Great Kantō earthquake, which destroyed most of Tokyo. After being sent to the reserve fleet in December 1923, she received a refit during 1924. Returning to the main fleet, the battlecruiser operated off China for periods of time in 1925–1926, until she returned to reserve from 1927 to 1931 in preparation for a major reconstruction. Her superstructure was rebuilt, and she received extensive upgrades to armour, propulsion, and waterline bulges. After a period of fleet duty in the early 1930s, she underwent a two-year reconstruction (1934–1936) to rebuild her as a Fast Battleship. This upgrade improved her engine plant, redesigned the superstructure, lengthened the stern, and enabled her to equip floatplanes. After serving as a transport and support-ship during the Second Sino-Japanese War, Kirishima escorted the aircraft carrier strikeforce bound for the attack on Pearl Harbor in December 1941. Following the start of World War II, Kirishima served as an escort during carrier attacks on Port Darwin and the Dutch East Indies. Kirishima joined her sister ships in escorting naval sorties against Ceylon. She once again served escort duty during the disastrous Battle of Midway, before transferring to Truk Lagoon in preparation for operations against American landings on Guadalcanal. After participating in the Battles of the Eastern Solomons and Santa Cruz, Kirishima joined Hiei in a night attack on 13 November 1942. Following the loss of the latter on the evening of 13 November, Kirishima subsequently engaged American battleships on the night of 14/15 November. With her engines largely disabled and listing heavily to starboard, Kirishima was abandoned in the early morning of 15 November 1942. She capsized and sank at 03:25 with the loss of 212 of her crew.

Haruna

Haruna was laid down at Kobe by Kawasaki on 16 March 1912, launched 14 December 1913, and formally commissioned 19 April 1915. After a short patrolling duty off Sasebo, Haruna suffered a breech explosion during gunnery drills on 12 September 1920; seven crewmen were killed and the No. 1 turret badly damaged. After a long period of time in reserve, Haruna underwent her first modernization from 1926 to 1928. The process upgraded her propulsion capabilities, enabled her to carry and launch floatplanes, increasing her armour capacity by over 4,000 tons, and was shortly thereafter reclassified as a Battleship. She was overhauled a second time from 1933 to 1935, which additionally strengthened her armour and reclassified her as a fast battleship. During the Second Sino-Japanese War, Haruna primarily served as a large-scale troop transport for Japanese troops to the Chinese mainland. On the eve of the commencement of World War II, Haruna sailed as part of Vice-Admiral Nobutake Kondō's Southern Force. On 8 December 1941, Haruna provided heavy support for the invasion of Malaya and Singapore. She participated in the major Japanese offensives in the southern and southwestern Pacific in early 1942, before sailing as part of the carrier-strike force during the Battle of Midway. Haruna bombarded American positions at Henderson Field at Guadalcanal, and provided escort to carriers during the Solomon Islands campaign. In 1943, she deployed as part of a larger force on multiple occasions to counter the threat of American carrier strikes, but did not actively participate in a single battle. In 1944, Haruna was an escort during the Battle of the Philippine Sea and fought American surface vessels off Samar during the Battle of Leyte Gulf. She was the only one of the four battleships in her class to survive 1944. Haruna remained at Kure throughout 1945, where she was sunk by aircraft of Task Force 38 on 28 July 1945, after taking nine bomb hits at her moorings. She was subsequently raised and broken up for scrap in 1946.

Notes

Footnotes

Citations

General references

 Boyle, David (1998). World War II in Photographs. London. Rebo Productions. 
 
 
 
 
 
 Jackson, Robert (editor) (2008). 101 Great Warships. London. Amber Books. 
 Jackson, Robert (2000).  The World's Great Battleships.  Brown Books.  
 
 

 McCurtie, Francis (1989) [1945]. Jane's Fighting Ships of World War II. London: Bracken Books. 
 Moore, John (1990) [1919]. Jane's Fighting Ships of World War I. London: Studio Editions. 
 
 
 
 
 Schom, Alan (2004). The Eagle and the Rising Sun: The Japanese-American War, 1941–1943. Norton & Company. 
 
 
 Steinberg, Rafael (1980) Return to the Philippines.  Time-Life Books Inc. 
 
 Swanston, Alexander & Swanston, Malcolm (2007). The Historical Atlas of World War II. London: Cartographica Press Ltd. 
 
 Willmott, H.P. & Keegan, John [1999] (2002). The Second World War in the Far East. Smithsonian Books. .
 

Battleship classes
Battlecruiser classes
 
 Kongo-class battleship